Kevin Thalien (born February 20, 1992 in Colombes, France) is a French basketball player who plays for French Pro A League club Nancy.

References

French men's basketball players
Sportspeople from Colombes
1992 births
Living people
BC Orchies players
SLUC Nancy Basket players
21st-century French people